Stephan Zuev (born October 31, 1988) is an alpine skier from Russia.  He competed for Russia at the 2010 Winter Olympics.

His best result was a 23rd place in the combined.

References

External links

1988 births
Living people
People from Kirovsk, Murmansk Oblast
Russian male alpine skiers
Olympic alpine skiers of Russia
Alpine skiers at the 2010 Winter Olympics
Alpine skiers at the 2014 Winter Olympics
Sportspeople from Murmansk Oblast